The 1948 Venezuelan coup d'état took place on 24 November 1948, when Carlos Delgado Chalbaud, Marcos Pérez Jiménez and Luis Felipe Llovera Páez overthrew the elected president, Rómulo Gallegos, who had been elected in the 1947 Venezuelan general election (generally believed to be the country's first honest election) and had taken office in February 1948. Chalbaud had been Gallegos' minister of defense. Jiménez took command of the country as its dictator.

Democracy would not be restored until the 1958 Venezuelan coup d'état overthrew Jiménez.

References 

Venezuela
Coup d'état
Military coups in Venezuela
Conflicts in 1948
November 1948 events in South America